Campbell River is a city in British Columbia on the east coast of Vancouver Island at the south end of Discovery Passage, which lies along the 50th parallel north along the important Inside Passage shipping route. Campbell River has a population (2016 census) of 35,138 and has long been touted as the "salmon capital of the world." Campbell River and Region are near the communities of Quadra and the Discovery Islands, Sayward, Oyster River, Gold River, Tahsis and Zeballos.

Campbell River is served by the coast-spanning Island Highway, the nearby but now defunct Island Rail Corridor, and a local airport.

History
The first settlers known in the area were members of the Island Comox and related Coast Salish peoples. During the 18th century, a migration of Kwakwaka'wakw (Kwak'wala-speaking) people of the Wakashan cultural and linguistic group migrated south from the area of Fort Rupert. Establishing themselves in the Campbell River area, they enslaved and later absorbed the Comox. These newcomers became infamous as raiders of the Coast Salish peoples farther south, who are known to history as the Euclataws (also spelled Yucultas), a variant on the Laich-kwil-tach, Lekwiltok or Legwildok, which is their name for themselves. There are two subdivisions of this group, also known as the Southern Kwakiutl: the Wekayi or Weiwaikai of the Cape Mudge Indian Band on Quadra Island and the Weiwaikum of the Campbell River Band located in and around the city of Campbell River.

The channel between Quadra Island and Campbell River is named Discovery Passage after HMS Discovery. The captain and his botanist, Mr Archibald Menzies, encountered a small tribe of 350 natives who spoke the Salish language. A Lekwiltok war party, heavily armed with European rifles, paddled south from Johnstone Strait in the middle of the 19th century and were in control of the area when  came through on a cartography mission under Captain George Henry Richards around 1859. Dr Samuel Campbell was the ship surgeon, and historians believe his name was given to the river by Richards. The community took the name "Campbell River" when its post office was constructed in 1907. Likewise, the name of HMS Discovery'''s First Lieutenant Zachary Mudge is preserved in the nearby Cape Mudge.

Sports fishermen travelled to the area as early as the 1880s, especially after the tales from anglers such as Sir Richard Musgrave and Sir John Rogers. The formation of the Campbell River Tyee Club in 1924, over concern regarding over-fishing of the salmon stocks, served to popularize the area among fishermen. E.P. Painter, for instance, moved to Campbell River the following year and opened his Painter's Lodge in 1929. Painter's Lodge attracted clientele from Hollywood and regular patrons included Bob Hope and Bing Crosby. Commercial fishing was a large industry for many years. The town's magistrate Roderick Haig-Brown purchased a fishing cabin on Campbell River and wrote a number of books on fly fishing for both sport fishermen and conservationists.

Industrial logging took off in the 1920s with Merrill Ring and Company, Bloedel, Stewart and Welch and Comox Logging. A large forest fire started near Buttle Lake and burned much of the valley in 1938. Rock Bay, Menzies Bay, and Englewood all were big logging camps.

After 1912, Campbell River became a supply point for northern Vancouver Island, Quadra Island, and Cortes Island. The E and N Railway was surveyed to Campbell River, yet it only reached Courtenay, forty miles south. In its original conception, it would have been the last leg of the transcontinental railway, which had been proposed to run down Bute Inlet after crossing the British Columbia Interior, connecting to Vancouver Island just north of Campbell River at Seymour Narrows. After the Second World War, Campbell River became a boomtown and industrial centre with the building of the John Hart Dam, Elk Falls pulp mill, and nearby mills in Tahsis and Gold River. Logging and mining in the area prospered. There is a lead zinc mine nearby as well as coal mines, while a large copper mine operated to the north.

In recent years Campbell River, about halfway up Vancouver Island, has continued to mark the boundary between the more developed south and the wild and natural areas of the northern part of the island. 
Local fish hatcheries help to maintain salmon stocks for the fishing industry.

There is uncertainty about the source of the name of the city. It is thought that the river and the city may have been named for Dr. Samuel Campbell, who was assistant surgeon aboard HMS Plumper from 1857 to 1861.

Climate
Campbell River has a Mediterranean climate (Köppen climate classification) Csb. January tends to see the most snow,  on average. In the winter months, occasional Arctic bursts from the interior of British Columbia can make their way to the coast, bringing temperatures below freezing. If a Pacific low reaches the coast, a large snowfall can occur.

Demographics

 Ethnicity 

Note: Totals greater than 100% due to multiple origin responses.

 Religion 
According to the 2021 census, religious groups in Campbell River included:
Irreligion (22,235 persons or 63.7%)
Christianity (11,585 persons or 33.2%)
Sikhism (200 persons or 0.6%)
Hinduism (175 persons or 0.5%)
Buddhism (150 persons or 0.4%)
Islam (65 persons or 0.2%)
Judaism (50 persons or 0.1%)
Indigenous Spirituality (35 persons or 0.1%)

Economy

Campbell River has a variety of growing industries and small businesses suitable to an oceanside community. As of 2012 the focus of business is directed towards aquaculture, agrifoods, clean energy development, construction, creative industries, forestry, fishing, health care, international education, mining, technology and tourism. Elk Falls Mill, one of the largest employers in the area shut down in 2009; however, logging continues to be a significant source of employment. There have been many cases of former mill employees moving away to other places with higher demands for a similar labour force, particularly Fort McMurray, Alberta.

Education
Public schools are administered by School District 72 Campbell River. North Island College has a campus in Campbell River. Campbell River has recently developed a new international program accepting students from Germany, Austria, and various other countries across Europe, South America, and Asia. Along with School District 72, there is also a private K–12 Christian school, this being Campbell River Christian School. The two public high schools are Carihi Secondary School and Timberline Secondary School. Carihi Secondary School is also a part of School District 93 Conseil scolaire francophone.

The Conseil scolaire francophone de la Colombie-Britannique operates one Francophone school in Campbell River: the école Mer-et-montagne'' primary school.

Politics
In the House of Commons of Canada, Campbell River is represented by the riding of North Island—Powell River (Rachel Blaney, NDP). In the Legislative Assembly of British Columbia, Campbell River is represented by the North Island (Claire Trevena, BC NDP) riding.

The mayor of Campbell River is Kermit Dahl. He was elected on 15 October 2022.

Transportation
The city is served by Campbell River Airport (YBL), Campbell River Water Aerodrome at Campbell River Harbour, a BC Ferries route to Quadra Island, and an inland island highway and an oceanside island highway which connect the community to the rest of Vancouver Island. Campbell River Transit System provides bus service to the city and neighbouring communities. Operated by Watson and Ash Transportation, the transit system is funded under a partnership between the City of Campbell River and BC Transit, the provincial agency that plans and manages municipal transit systems.

Movies filmed in Campbell River

Notable residents
Sybil Andrews – artist
Rod Brind'Amour – National Hockey League player (born in Ottawa but learned to play hockey in Campbell River) and current coach of the Carolina Hurricanes
Dawn Coe-Jones – golfer, winner of three LPGA Tour tournaments
Brett Connolly – National Hockey League player
John Davison – cricketer (born in Campbell River but grew up in Australia)
Kris Fredheim – retired professional hockey player
Roderick Haig-Brown – judge, author, and conservationist
Teal Harle – freestyle skier, placed fifth in slope style in the 2018 Winter Olympics
Andrew Nikiforuk – journalist
Cameron Levins – long-distance runner, Olympian
Barry Pepper – actor
Jacqueline Pirie – (former) actress (born in Scotland, but had a drama school in Campbell River also known as Jacqueline Chadwick)
Nicholas Thorburn – musician
Avalon Wasteneys – rower, Olympic gold medalist

Media
Shaw TV Community Television (formerly Campbell River TV Association)
Campbell River Mirror newspaper
88.7 FM – CHVI-FM, Christian radio
97.3 FM – CKLR-FM, hot adult contemporary
99.7 FM – CIQC-FM, adult contemporary
100.7 FM – CKCC-FM, country music

Sister City
Since 1983, Campbell River has been a sister or twinned city of Ishikari, in the Hokkaido region of Japan. This twinning was based on the importance of salmon to both cities.

Notes

References

External links

 
Cities in British Columbia
Mining communities in British Columbia
Northern Vancouver Island
Populated places on the British Columbia Coast